Bhimsen may refer to:
Bhimasena, known as Bhima
Bhimsen, Kanpur, a town in Uttar Pradesh, India
 Bhimsen Joshi (1922–2011), Indian vocalist
 Bhimsen (raga) A raga created by Mahesh Mahadev
Bhimsen Thapa, the longest ruling Mukhtiyar (equivalent to Prime Minister) of Nepal
Bhimsen Tower, former heritage tower in Kathmandu by Bhimsen Thapa